Milan Dudić (Serbian Cyrillic: Милан Дудић; born 1 November 1979) is a Serbian retired professional footballer who played as a defender.

International career
He was a member of the Serbia and Montenegro national football team for the 2006 FIFA World Cup. His best known action in the tournament, however, was committing a handball twice in a match against Ivory Coast, resulting in two successful penalty kicks against his team.

Personal life
His twin brother Ivan is also a former professional footballer, playing for Čukarički and Red Star Belgrade.

Career statistics

International

Honours
 Serbian Superliga: 2003–04, 2005–06
 Serbia and Montenegro Cup: 2003–04, 2005–06
 Austrian Bundesliga: 2006–07, 2008–09

References

External links

 

1979 births
Living people
Sportspeople from Kraljevo
Serbian footballers
FK Sloga Kraljevo players
FK Čukarički players
Red Star Belgrade footballers
FC Red Bull Salzburg players
SK Sturm Graz players
Austrian Football Bundesliga players
Expatriate footballers in Austria
2006 FIFA World Cup players
Serbia and Montenegro international footballers
Serbian expatriate footballers
Serbian expatriate sportspeople in Austria
Association football defenders
Serbia and Montenegro footballers
Twin sportspeople
Serbian twins